The Splendor of Love (aliases: The Beauty of Love Egyptian Arabic: روعة الحب, translit. Rawa'et Al Hubb) is a 1968 Egyptian film directed by Mahmoud Zulfikar.

Synopsis 
The young girl Hayam marries the author Mahmoud Salem, who has always read in his eyes the ideas and opinions contained in his books. Then, Hayam returns and runs away from the house while he is chasing her. During the escape, an attractive young man, Ahmed appears to her, whom the Maadi girls love. Almost settled on the airport grounds and at the end, everyone dies.

Crew 

 Director: Mahmoud Zulfikar
 Writer: Hala El Hefnawy
 Screenwriter: Mohamed Abu Houssef
 Producer: Farouk Naguib
 Studio: Ramses Naguib
 Distribution: 
 Cairo Distribution company (domestic)
 Arab Cinema Corporation (worldwide)

Cast

Primary cast 

 Rushdy Abaza as Ahmed
 Naglaa Fathi as Hayam
 Yehia Chahine as Mahmoud Salem
 Abdul Moneim Ibrahim as Hassan
 Madiha Hamdi as Huda
 Karima Sharif as Fawzia

Guest stars 

 Mahmoud El-Meliguy
 Emad Hamdy
 Nadia Seif El-Nasr

Supporting cast 

 Alia Abdel Moneim
 Baher El-Sayed
 Salwa my intelligence
 Essam Al-Halabi
 Mervat Ezzo
 Nayel Abdel-Maksoud
 Gamila Attia
 Fahmy Rashad
 Aida Waheed

References

External links 

 
 The Splendor of Love on elCinema

1968 films
1960s Arabic-language films
20th-century Egyptian films
Egyptian black-and-white films
Films shot in Egypt